is a Japanese musician, singer, model, and actress. She is a former member of the kawaii metal group Babymetal and the idol group Sakura Gakuin. In October 2018, she left Babymetal due to an undisclosed illness. She is managed by the Amuse, Inc. talent agency.

Biography 
On August 2, 2010, at the age of 11, Mizuno joined Sakura Gakuin, an idol group managed by the talent agency Amuse, Inc. She joined at the same time as another future Babymetal member, Moa Kikuchi. Sakura Gakuin had not yet released its debut single. During their audition, Mizuno and Kikuchi performed a duo dance cover of "Over The Future" by Karen Girl's, two former members of which, Ayami Mutō and Suzuka Nakamoto, had also recently joined Sakura Gakuin.

Besides performing as a whole group, Sakura Gakuin members were also divided into smaller subgroups known as "clubs." Each club had its own musical group that recorded its own songs. Mizuno and Kikuchi first became members of the "Baton Club" and its musical group Twinklestars. As backing singers and dancers, they were later teamed with lead singer Suzuka Nakamoto in a "Heavy Music" club, with the associated music group being named Babymetal. Before the formation of this club, none of the three members knew what heavy metal was.

Babymetal became an independent recording group in 2012. Mizuno "graduated" from Sakura Gakuin in 2015, and from then on performed with Babymetal exclusively. Mizuno and Kikuchi have a writing credit under the name "Black Babymetal" on the first Babymetal album in 2014, having written "Song 4" together during a bus trip. The second Babymetal album, Metal Resistance, was released in 2016.

Following a leave from the show Legend "S" Baptism XX, Mizuno was absent from Babymetal's tour of the United States in May 2018, with no advance warning. Amid fan speculation on Mizuno's status with the group, a representative of 5B Management, the American management company representing Babymetal, replied to an inquiry from Alternative Press Magazine by saying that "Yuimetal remains a member of the band, but she is not on this current U.S. tour." However, she was also absent from Babymetal's European tour in June 2018. On October 19, 2018, Babymetal officially announced that Yuimetal would not be joining the band for the next phase of their tour and would no longer be a member of the group due to poor health. Mizuno released a statement shortly after about her decision to leave Babymetal, explaining that she may go on to pursue a solo career in the future.

Personal life
In third grade, Mizuno was a fan of Karen Girl's, Suzuka Nakamoto's previous group, and had dreamed of joining the group after their music helped her endure the "life-threatening" illness of a family member. The group disbanded, however, and she attended the group's farewell concert and met all three members. During the Legend "D" concert in 2012, Babymetal performed a cover of the Karen Girl's song "Over the Future". Mizuno says that moment was when her "dreams came true".

She and her family are also close friends with Karen Girl's member Ayami Muto and her family; Mizuno and Muto were both members of Sakura Gakuin.

Mizuno is known for being fond of tomatoes and likes to eat them whole. She has stated that she would want to eat tomatoes even when the world is ending. Mizuno has specified in one of her Sakura Gakuin diary entry that she loves to stargaze. She loves to look up to the stars during her commute time from school to home. She has also stated in her diary entry that she loves to read books about constellations as well. Mizuno has two brothers, one older and one two years younger than her.

Associated acts 
 Sakura Gakuin (2010–2015)
Twinklestars (Sakura Gakuin sub-unit)
 Mini-Pati (Sakura Gakuin sub-unit)
 Babymetal (2010–2018)
 Black Babymetal (Babymetal subunit)

Discography

With Sakura Gakuin 
Sakura Gakuin 2010 Nendo: Message (2011)
Sakura Gakuin 2011 Nendo: Friends (2012)
Sakura Gakuin 2012 Nendo: My Generation (2013)
Sakura Gakuin 2013 Nendo: Kizuna (2014)
Sakura Gakuin 2014 Nendo: Kimi ni Todoke (2015)

With Babymetal 
Babymetal (2014)
Metal Resistance (2016)

Filmography 
 Television
  (2009)
 Sagasō! Nippon Hito no Wasuremono (2009)
 Kioku no Umi (2010)

 Films
 A Happy Birthday (2009)

References

External links 
 Official profile at Amuse Inc.

Babymetal members
Sakura Gakuin members
1999 births
Living people
Japanese female idols
Japanese women heavy metal singers
21st-century Japanese women singers
Musicians from Kanagawa Prefecture
Kawaii metal musicians
Amuse Inc. talents